was a Japanese serial killer.

Early life
Hidaka was born in the Miyazaki Prefecture. He was originally an excellent student, but he failed to enter the University of Tsukuba, his target college. He entered the Fukuoka University instead, but eventually dropped out. He often borrowed money, drank and went to prostitutes. In April 1989, he moved to Hiroshima and began to work as a taxi driver. 

Hidaka married in 1991, and had a daughter in 1993, but his wife entered a mental hospital.

Murders
Hidaka killed and robbed four women between April and September 1996. One of his victims was a 16-year-old girl who engaged in Enjo kōsai. He was arrested on September 21, 1996.

Trial and execution
The district court in Hiroshima sentenced Hidaka to death on February 9, 2000, a sentence that he did not appeal. He was executed by hanging on December 25, 2006. After his execution, his lawyer, Shuichi Adachi, protested that he had been illegally refused access to his client by prison authorities.

See also
List of executions in Japan
List of serial killers by country

References

External links 
 Article on the serial murders
 Japanese Wikipedia entry on the murder case

1962 births
1996 murders in Japan
2006 deaths
21st-century executions by Japan
Executed Japanese serial killers
Japanese murderers of children
Japanese people convicted of murder
Japanese taxi drivers
Male serial killers
People convicted of murder by Japan
People executed by Japan by hanging
People from Miyazaki Prefecture
Violence against women in Japan